This is a list of candidates of the 1933 South Australian state election.

Retiring MPs

Official Labor

 John Jonas (Port Adelaide) – lost preselection
 Frank Nieass (East Torrens) – lost preselection

Parliamentary Labor

 Frederick Birrell (North Adelaide) – retired
 George Cooke (Barossa) – retired
 Lionel Hill (Port Pirie) – appointed Agent General in London
 Leonard Hopkins (Barossa) – retired
 James Jelley MLC (Central District No. 1) – retired

Liberal and Country League

 William George Mills MLC (Northern District) – retired
 James Moseley (Flinders) – retired
 George Henry Prosser MLC (Central District No. 2) – retired
 Thomas Pascoe MLC (Midland District) – retired

House of Assembly
Sitting members are shown in bold text. Successful candidates are marked with an asterisk.

Legislative Council
Sitting members are shown in bold text. Successful candidates are marked with an asterisk.

Notes

 Bob Dale, the independent Labor MHA for Sturt, contested the 1933 election as a Lang Labor Party candidate for Adelaide.
 Arthur McArthur, the incumbent PLP MHA for East Torrens, contested the 1933 election in Barossa.
 John Herbert Cooke lost Liberal and Country League preselection to recontest Central District No. 2 and contested Central District No. 1 as an independent instead.

References

1933 elections in Australia
Candidates for South Australian state elections
1930s in South Australia